Furs are thick growths of hair that cover the skin of many animals.

Furs may refer to:

 Fur clothing
 Fur people, an ethnic group predominantly inhabiting western Sudan 
 Fuero in Spanish, or Fur in Catalan, a Spanish legal term and concept
 Furs of Valencia, the laws of the Kingdom of Valencia 
 The Psychedelic Furs, sometimes The Furs, an English rock band
 Zenthoefer Furs, an American soccer club

See also

 Fur (disambiguation)
 Firs, a genus of trees
 Furry fandom, a subculture interested in anthropomorphic animal characters with human personalities and characteristics